Nikesh Arora (born February 9, 1968) is an Indian-American business executive. Arora was formerly a senior executive at Google. He served as the president of SoftBank Group from October 2014 to June 2016. On June 1, 2018, Arora took on the role of CEO and chairman at Palo Alto Networks.

Education 
Born to an Indian Air Force officer, Arora completed his schooling at The Air Force School (Subroto Park), and went on to graduate from the Indian Institute of Technology, BHU in Varanasi, India, with a Bachelor of Technology degree in electrical engineering in 1989. He holds a degree from Boston College and an MBA from Northeastern University. He has held the CFA designation since 1999.

Professional career

T-Motion PLC 
In 2000, Arora established T-Motion, a subsidiary within Deutsche Telekom, "providing value-added services to the 3G Services of Deutsche Telekom." A few years after, in 2002, T-Motion was integrated into T-Mobile's core services.

Google 
Arora joined Google in 2004. He held multiple senior operating leadership roles at Google, serving as vice president, Europe operations from 2004 to 2007, president Europe, Middle East and Africa from 2007 to 2009, and president, global sales operations and business development from 2009 to 2010. He was senior vice president and chief business officer of Google Inc. (Google) since January 2011 until July 2014.

He left Google in July 2014 resigning from the post of senior vice president and chief business officer.

SoftBank Corp. 
As president and chief operating officer of SoftBank Corp. Arora received over $200 million in compensation over the last two years" while at the head of Softbank's operations. This pay package made him the world's highest paid executive.

Other experiences 
Arora worked as chief marketing officer and as a Member of the management board at T-Mobile, Bharti Airtel, Europe and serves as a Trustee at the Paley Center for Media in Los Angeles, California.

Since 2007, Arora has also served as a senior advisor to Silver Lake Partners, a private equity firm.

From 2001 to 2004, he served as chief marketing officer of the T-Mobile International Division of Deutsche Telekom AG. He was chief executive officer and founder of T-Motion PLC, which merged with T-Mobile International in 2002.

Arora began his career at Fidelity Investments in 1992, holding a variety of finance and technology management positions, ultimately serving as vice president, finance of Fidelity Technologies.

Nikesh Arora worked for Deutsche Telekom, Putnam Investments, Fidelity Investments.

References 

Google employees
SoftBank people
Living people
Banaras Hindu University alumni
Boston College alumni
Northeastern University alumni
CFA charterholders
1968 births
20th-century American businesspeople
21st-century American businesspeople
Indian emigrants to the United States
American people of Indian descent
American computer businesspeople
Chief executives in the technology industry
American chief executives
American technology chief executives
Computer networking people
Thapar family